Now Deh-e Malek (also Romanized as Now Deh-e Malek) is a village in Qoroq Rural District, Baharan District, Gorgan County, Golestan Province, Iran. At the 2006 census, its population was 3,113, in 804 families.

References 

Populated places in Gorgan County